Mike Whitehead (born November 25, 1975) is a Canadian wheelchair rugby player. He has been with the team since 2001 and has won medals at several Paralympic Games. He was recruited to wheelchair rugby directly out of his rehabilitation hospital by teammate David Willsie and made the team less than a year later.

References

External links
 Mike Whitehead on Canadian Wheelchair Sports Association
 
 

1975 births
Living people
Canadian wheelchair rugby players
Paralympic wheelchair rugby players of Canada
Paralympic gold medalists for Canada
Paralympic silver medalists for Canada
Paralympic medalists in wheelchair rugby
Medalists at the 2004 Summer Paralympics
Medalists at the 2012 Summer Paralympics
Medalists at the 2008 Summer Paralympics
Wheelchair rugby players at the 2004 Summer Paralympics
Wheelchair rugby players at the 2008 Summer Paralympics
Wheelchair rugby players at the 2012 Summer Paralympics